Christiane-Josée Vigneron-Ramackers (25 January 1914 – 30 August 2002), also known as Jo Delande, was a Belgian music educator, conductor and composer. She is known for founding the Academie voor Muziek, Theater & Dans in Maasmechelen in 1945 and for several prize-winning compositions.

Biography 
Josée Vigneron-Ramackers was born on 25 January 1914, in Leopoldsburg, Limbourg in Belgium. Her father was director of the boys' school of the Coal Mines in Eisden, where she lived from 1921. Her mother was the daughter of lyricist Jean-G. Close, and a soprano singing in charity concerts.

She studied at the Zusters Kindsheid Jesu's (Sisters of the Childhood of Jesus) normal school in Hasselt, and at the Limburgse Orgel- en Zangschool under the tuition of Herman and Arthur Meulemans, where she learned harmony and counterpoint. She obtained her organ, piano and teaching diplomas in 1934.

Vigneron-Ramackers was then appointed to the Koninklÿk Atheneum of Eisden and the Atheneum of Maaseik, where she taught singing and drawing from 1934 to 1969. In the meantime, she pursued her studies by correspondence, learning about fugue with Herman Meulemans, and orchestration with Arthur Meulemans and Paul Gilson.

In 1945, she founded the free music school Tuinwijk in Eisden, which would become the Gemeentelijke Muziekacademie in 1973, when taken over by the Maasmechelen community, and served as its director until 1979. There, great importance was paid to the all-round education of musicians: compulsory Dutch and cultural history courses were introduced, as well as numerous exhibitions and drawing lessons.

In 1955, she created the Jeugd en Muziek department in Eisden, and opened a free music course for youth (Jeugdmuziekschool) in her academy, in order to remedy to some extent the pedagogical shortcomings of formal music education.

Vigneron-Ramackers also got involved in her father's school orchestra, turning the pre-war amateur band into a full-fledged chamber orchestra, the Kamerorkest van de Muziekacademie.

She received the Koopal Prize from the Ministry of Education and Culture in 1961 for five of her compositions. On 8 February 1978, she was awarded the prize for music of the province of Limburg. On 14 March 1981, she was made Officer of the Order of Leopold II by the Governor Vandermeulen.

Musical style 
Most of her music was composed with small ensembles in mind. She was at first influenced by the impressionist current, then her work turned out to be more in the neo-classical vein.

Compositions

Works for orchestra 

 1958: Concertino, for oboe and chamber orchestra
 1969: Mobiles, for 4 clarinets, percussion and string orchestra
 Studies, for small orchestra

Works for wind orchestra 

 1957: Vier etudes, for symphonic wind orchestra

Musical theatre

Stage music 

 1936: Er was eens
 1937: De Sneeuwkoningin
 1938: Het daghet (text by Ysbrand Paulus Stasse)

Vocal music

Works for choir 

 1972: Drie zangen van liefde en dood

Songs 

 1943: Rossignol, es-tu damné?, for voice and piano
 1943: Quatre mélodies, for voice and piano
 1956: Trois mélodies, for voice and orchestra
 1972: Vocalise, for voice and piano, op. 18
 1981: Vocalise 2, for voice and piano, op. 20
 1982: Huit mélodies, for voice and piano
 1984: Dix Vocalises, for voice and piano
 Sept mélodies, for soprano and piano, op. 61
 Vieilles chansons et rondes françaises, for middle voice and piano

Chamber music 

 1958: Duo rhapsodique, for clarinet and piano
 1958: Hommage à Maurice Van Guchte, for clarinet octet
 1959: Saxofoonkwartet
 1965: Petit cortège presque chinois, for piano and two timbales, op. 10
 1968: 3 Études de style, for oboe and saxophone
 1972: Alternato, for cor anglais and piano
 1984: Sonatine, for oboe and organ

Works for organ 

 1972: Haute Fagnes, op. 15

Works for piano 

 1967: Ballade des oiseaux captifs
 1968: 6 Mini studi, op. 11
 1971: 2 Preludi, op. 12

Works for guitar 

 1972: Variations sur Harbouya

Pedagogical works 

 1967: Van kleuterdreun naar notenleer
 1968: Door volkslied tot notenleer
 1971: Notenboekje

References

1914 births
2002 deaths
20th-century classical composers
Women classical composers
Belgian classical composers
Officers of the Order of Leopold II
20th-century women composers